François Gardier (27 March 1903 – 15 February 1971) was a Belgian racing cyclist. He won the 1933 edition of the Liège–Bastogne–Liège.

References

External links
 

1903 births
1971 deaths
Belgian male cyclists
People from Soumagne
Cyclists from Liège Province